Kuala Penyu Town is the capital of the Kuala Penyu District in the Interior Division of Sabah, Malaysia. Its population was estimated to be around 659 in 2010, with ethnic Dusun Tatana sub-group forming the largest single ethnic group.

Geography 
Kuala Penyu is located on the Klias Peninsula, which was once originally covered with mangrove swamp forests. Much of these mangrove swamps were destroyed by land developers that later realised that the soils were much too acidic to support palm oil.

Climate
Kuala Penyu has a tropical rainforest climate (Af) with heavy to very heavy rainfall year-round.

Demographics 
According to general unrecorded consensus, most Kuala Penyuan are farmers with some younger generations are migrating to towns. It is widely diversified with unrecorded consensus has it that majority are embracing or practising Christianity or Islam, while some are still sticking to animism. As a part of clarification on ethnic group in Kuala Penyu, it's fair enough to mention that every one of them specifically by percentage base on previous official record through consensus report year 2010 was stated 659 peoples, where the most races as follow; ethnic Dusun people of the Dusun Tatana and Bisaya sub-groups, Bruneian Malay, Kedayan, Bajau, Chinese, Indian and others.

Gallery

References

External links 

Kuala Penyu District
Towns in Sabah